K-line in spectrometry refers to one of two different spectral features:

 The calcium K line, one of the pair of Fraunhofer lines in the violet associated with ionised calcium
 The x-ray peak (K-line (x-ray)) associated with iron